The Kamenschiks or Bukhtarman are a group of Russians who descend from the earliest settlers of South Siberia.  They are Old Believers and originally lived along the Kerzhenets River in Nizhny Novgorod Governorate. They later moved to the banks of the Bukhtarma River.

References
Wixman, Ronald. The Peoples of the USSR, (Armonk: Sharpe, 1984) p. 32

Old Believers
Ethnoreligious groups
Ethnic groups in Siberia
Russian sub-ethnic groups
Social groups of Russia